The Lakota Formation is a sequence of rocks of early Cretaceous (Berriasian to Barremian) age from Western North America. Located in South Dakota, the name of the formation is derived from the Lakota Native American tribe.

There are two units of the Lakota Formation, the Chilson Member (upper Berriasian to Valanginian) and the underlying Fuson Member (upper Valanginian to early Barremian). A Berriasian-Valanginian age for the Chilson Member has been extrapolated by means of ostracods and charophytes.

Vertebrate paleofauna

Dinosaurs

Mammals

Turtles

References 

Geologic formations of South Dakota
Cretaceous geology of South Dakota
Cretaceous Manitoba
Cretaceous geology of Nebraska
Berriasian Stage
Valanginian Stage
Hauterivian Stage
Barremian Stage
Lower Cretaceous Series of North America